O. Panneerselvam was sworn in as Chief Minister of Tamil Nadu on 6 December 2016. O. Panneerselvam was elected as the Chief Minister of Tamil Nadu following the death of incumbent Chief Minister Jayalalithaa.

Cabinet ministers
Ministers sworn on 6 December 2016:

References

All India Anna Dravida Munnetra Kazhagam
P
2010s in Tamil Nadu
2016 establishments in Tamil Nadu
2017 disestablishments in India
Cabinets established in 2016
Cabinets disestablished in 2017
2016 in Indian politics